Yli is a village in Notodden municipality, Norway. It is located west of Notodden city, across the river Heddøla. Its population is 324.

References

Villages in Vestfold og Telemark
Notodden